Zheleznodorozhnaya Kazarma 538 km is a rural locality (a station) in Vesyoloyarsky Selsoviet, Rubtsovsky District, Altai Krai, Russia. The population was 16 as of 2013. There is 1 street.

References 

Rural localities in Rubtsovsky District